Children Teaching a Cat to Dance or The Dancing Lesson is an oil-on-panel genre painting by Jan Steen, executed c.1660–1679 and now in the Rijksmuseum in Amsterdam.

The painting depicts a group of children attempting to make a cat dance to the music of a shawm. The cat is screeching and the dog barking but the children are having fun. However, the old man at the window clearly disapproves of their behaviour.

The work is a typical example of Steen's indoor scenes of everyday Dutch life.

Origin 
The work comes from the collection of the jonkheer Jacob Salomon Hendrik van de Poll (1837–1880) in Amsterdam. He bequeathed his collection to the Rijksmuseum in 1880.

External links
SK-A-718 painting record on museum website

1660s paintings
1670s paintings
Paintings by Jan Steen
Paintings in the collection of the Rijksmuseum
Paintings of children
Cats in art
Dogs in art
Dance in art
Musical instruments in art